Vicente Krause (born 13 September 1899) was an Argentine fencer. He competed in the individual sabre event at the 1936 Summer Olympics.

References

External links
 

1899 births
Year of death missing
Argentine male sabre fencers
Olympic fencers of Argentina
Fencers at the 1936 Summer Olympics
Argentine people of German descent